Frido Frey (October 26, 1921 – May 16, 2000) was a German professional basketball player. A 6'2" forward, he was the first German player in the National Basketball Association (then the Basketball Association of America).

Frey attended New Utrecht High School in Brooklyn, where he served as captain of his basketball team. Art Modell described him as "one of the best high-school basketball players in the city". Frey then played basketball at Long Island University during the 1941–42 season, and with the Manhattan Beach Coast Guard. He played 23 regular season games for the New York Knicks during the 1946–47 BAA season and scored 88 points.

BAA career statistics

Regular season

Playoffs

Notes

1921 births
2000 deaths
Forwards (basketball)
German men's basketball players
LIU Brooklyn Blackbirds men's basketball players
National Basketball Association players from Germany
New York Knicks players
New Utrecht High School alumni
German emigrants to the United States